Spring Cove Cliffs is a 2.0 hectare geological Site of Special Scientific Interest near the town of Weston-super-Mare, North Somerset, notified in 1952.

The site is listed in the Geological Conservation Review, because of the stratigraphic and igneous features which are displayed. The lava, which is pillowed in places, is believed to have been extruded upon a sloping seafloor.

References

Sites of Special Scientific Interest in North Somerset
Sites of Special Scientific Interest notified in 1952
Cliffs of England
Weston-super-Mare